The 2022 Oklahoma Senate general election were held on November 8, 2022. The primary elections for the Republican, Democratic, and Libertarian parties' nominations took place on June 28, 2022. Runoff primary elections, if no candidate received 50% in the June 28 vote, took place on August 23.  All candidates had to file between the days of April 13–15, 2022. Oklahoma voters elected state senators in 24 of the state's 48 Senate districts. State senators served four-year terms in the Oklahoma Senate.

The 2022 election cycle was the first election following redistricting. Redistricting in Oklahoma was postponed to a special legislative session, because of the 2020 United States census data's release being delayed. New state senate districts were signed into law based on data from the 2020 United States census on November 22, 2021.

Results summary
The 2022 election results were compared below to the November 2020 election. The results summary below does not include blank and over/under votes which were included in the official results.

Seats

Partisan comparison

Before the election

After the election

Retirements

Republicans

Retiring
District 12: James Leewright retired.
District 28: Zack Taylor retired.

Term Limited
District 2: Marty Quinn retired due to term limits and to run for U. S. representative in Oklahoma's 2nd congressional district.
District 4: Mark Allen retired due to term limits.
District 14: Frank Simpson retired due to term limits.
District 18: Kim David retired due to term limits and to run for corporation commissioner.

New members

Incumbents defeated
District 22: Jake A. Merrick lost renomination to Kristen Thompson, who won the general election.
District 34: J.J. Dossett lost the general election to Dana Prieto.

Open seats
District 2: Ally Seifried (Republican)
District 4: Tom Woods (Republican)
District 12: Todd Gollihare (Republican)
District 14: Jerry Alvord (Republican)
District 18: Jack Stewart (Republican)
District 28: Grant Green (Republican)

Uncontested races
9 Senators were the only candidate to file in their district.

The following Senators were re-elected without opposition:
District 6: David Bullard (Republican)
District 8: Roger Thompson (Republican)
District 16: Mary B. Boren (Democratic)
District 20: Chuck Hall (Republican)
District 24: Darrell Weaver (Republican)
District 38: Brent Howard (Republican)
District 44: Michael Brooks-Jimenez (Democratic)
District 46: Kay Floyd (Democratic)
The following Senators were elected for the first time without opposition:
District 14: Jerry Alvord (Republican)

Predictions

Summary of elections

Race by District

District 2
Incumbent Republican Marty Quinn is term limited.

Republican primary

Candidates
Advanced to runoff
Jarrin Jackson, ammo company owner, retired U.S. Army soldier, and candidate for Oklahoma's 2nd congressional district in 2016 and 2018
Ally Seifried, account manager for Müllerhaus Legacy, former executive assistant to Oklahoma State Senator Dan Newberry (2016-2017), and former Rogers State University basketball player
Eliminated in primary
Keith Austin, Cherokee Nation Tribal Councilor for the 14th district
Coy Jenkins, Rogers County Sheriff's Office Major, former Tulsa Police Department officer, and former  chief of the Oklahoma City University Police Department

Endorsements

Results

Runoff

General Election

Candidates
Ally Seifried (Republican)

 Jennifer Esau (Democratic)

Endorsements

Results

District 4
Incumbent Republican Mark Allen is term limited in 2022. Since no non-Republican candidates filed for the race, the August 23rd primary runoff will determine the next Senator from the district.

Republican Primary
Since the Republican Party holds closed primaries, only registered Republican voters may vote in the primary.

Candidates
Advanced to runoff
Tom Woods, dairy farmer, feed store owner, and trucking company owner
Keith Barenberg, retired Oklahoma state trooper and former Oklahoma Highway Patrol Liaison to the Oklahoma Legislature (2016).
Eliminated in primary
Hoguen Apperson, rancher, operator of Circle R Land and Cattle, and employee of AST Storage
Tom Callan, owner of Zena Suri Alpaca Ranch and adjunct professor of American government at Northeastern Oklahoma A&M College.
Declared, but failed to file
Ernie Martens, Mayor of Sallisaw, Oklahoma

Endorsements

Results

Primary

Runoff

District 10

Republican Primary
Since the Republican Party holds closed primaries, only registered Republican voters may vote in the primary. Incumbent Bill Coleman defeated primary challenger Emily DeLozier.

Candidates
Nominee
 Bill Coleman, incumbent
Eliminated in primary
 Emily DeLozier

Endorsements

Results

District 12
Incumbent James Leewright is retiring in 2022. Since no non-Republican candidates filed for the race, the June 28th Republican primary will determine the next Senator from the district. Todd Gollihare won the Republican primary for the open seat defeating Rob Ford.

Republican Primary
Since the Republican Party holds closed primaries, only registered Republican voters may vote in the primary.

Candidates
Nominee
 Todd Gollihare, retired U.S. Marine Corps veteran, retired chief probation officer for the Northern District of Oklahoma, and Kellyville High School teacher and former Kellyville school board member
Eliminated in primary
 Rob Ford, trustee and treasurer for Mounds, Oklahoma (2017-2020), chairman of the Creek County Republican Party, and nephew of State Representative Ross Ford

Endorsements

Results

District 18
Incumbent Kim David is term limited in 2022 and running for corporate commissioner. In 2022 redistricting, the 18th district was moved from southeast Tulsa, most of Wagoner County, and parts of  Cherokee, Mayes, Muskogee and Tulsa counties to being centered around Yukon, Oklahoma in west Oklahoma County and east Canadian County.

Since no non-Republican candidates filed for the race, the June 28th Republican primary will determine the next Senator from the district. Jack Stewart defeated Hunter Zearley in the Republican primary for the open seat.

Republican Primary
Since the Republican Party holds closed primaries, only registered Republican voters may vote in the primary.

Candidates
Nominee
 Jack Stewart, Canadian County Commissioner (2010-2022) and former Oklahoma Department of Transportation employee
Eliminated in primary
 Hunter Zearley, appointments and leadership assistant for Oklahoma House Speaker Charles McCall

Endorsements

Results

District 22

Republican Primary
First term incumbent Jake A. Merrick, who was elected in a special election, was defeated by primary challenger Kristen Thompson in the June Republican primary.

Candidates
Nominee
 Kristen Thompson, business owner
Eliminated in primary
 Jake A. Merrick, incumbent
Withdrew
 John Williams

Endorsements

Results

General Election

Candidates
Kristen Thompson (Republican)
Blake Aguirre (Democratic)

Endorsements

Results

District 26
Since no non-Republican candidates filed for the race, the August 23rd primary runoff will determine the next Senator from the district.

Republican Primary

Candidates
Advanced to runoff
 Darcy Jech, incumbent, small business owner, and cattle rancher
 Brady Butler, president and owner of Struck Rock Oil and Gas
Eliminated in primary
 J.J. Stitt, distant cousin of Kevin Stitt

Endorsements

Results

Primary

Runoff

District 28
Incumbent Senator Zack Taylor retired and did not seek reelection in 2022.

Republican Primary
Candidates
 Grant Green, farmer, rancher, and former owner of Green Propane
 Jeff McCommas, construction company and ranch owner
 Jamey Mullin, plumber, vice president of the Board of Directors of the Edmond Chamber of Commerce, and brother of Markwayne Mullin
Robert Trimble, veteran of Texas National Guard and United States Army and furniture store owner
Withdrew
 Bob Donohoo (filed for the Republican primary, but withdrew from the race.)

Democratic Primary
Candidates
 Karen Rackley, nurse practitioner
 Tony Wilson, owner and operator of Tone's United Nation Pizza food truck

District 30

General Election
Candidates
Lori Callahan (Republican)
Julia Kirt, incumbent (Democratic)
Endorsements

District 32

General Election
Candidates
Johnny Jernigan (Democratic)
John Montgomery, incumbent (Republican)

District 34

Republican Primary
Candidates
 Bradley Peixotto
 Dana Prieto
Withdrew
 Amy Cook (filed for the Republican primary but withdrew from the race.)

General Election
Candidates
 Dana Prieto (Republican)
 J. J. Dossett, incumbent State Senator (Democrat)
Endorsements

District 36

Republican Primary
Candidates
 John Haste, incumbent
 David Dambroso, candidate for state senate in 2018
Endorsements

District 40

Republican Primary
Candidates
 Mariam Daly 
 Nadine Smith 
Endorsements

General Election
Candidates
 Mariam Daly
 Carri Hicks, incumbent (Democratic)
Endorsements

District 42

Republican Primary
Candidates
 Brenda Stanley, incumbent
 Christopher Toney
Endorsements

District 48

Democratic Primary
Candidates
Rico Trayvon Smith, community activist and candle company owner
George E. Young, incumbent

See also
2022 United States elections
2022 Oklahoma House of Representatives election
2022 Oklahoma gubernatorial election

References

Notes

Senate
Oklahoma Senate
Oklahoma Senate elections